dietlibc is a C standard library released under the GNU General Public License Version 2, and proprietary licenses are also available. It was developed with the help of about 100 volunteers by Felix von Leitner with the goal to compile and link programs to the smallest possible size. dietlibc was developed from scratch and thus only implements the most important and commonly used functions. It is mainly used in embedded devices.

See also

C standard libraries

References

Further reading

External links
 
 Comparison of C/POSIX standard library implementations for Linux

C standard library
Free computer libraries
Free software programmed in C
Interfaces of the Linux kernel
Linux APIs
Software using the GPL license